Tiffany Gauthier (born 2 December 1993) is a French former alpine ski racer.

Season standings

World Championship results

Olympic results

References

1993 births
Living people
French female alpine skiers
Place of birth missing (living people)
Université Savoie-Mont Blanc alumni
Alpine skiers at the 2018 Winter Olympics
Alpine skiers at the 2022 Winter Olympics
Olympic alpine skiers of France